The Georgetown–Silver Plume National Historic Landmark District is a federally designated United States National Historic Landmark that comprises the Town of Georgetown, the Town of Silver Plume, and the Georgetown Loop Historic Mining & Railroad Park between the two  silver mining towns along Clear Creek in the Front Range of the Rocky Mountains in Clear Creek County, Colorado, United States.

The district includes well-preserved examples of the buildings and mining structures of the Colorado Silver Boom from 1864 to 1893. Historic steam locomotives pull passenger trains over the loop from late May through the beautiful Autumn colors of early October. Guided tours of the Lebanon Silver Mine are also available.

The district was designated a National Historic Landmark on 1966-11-13.

History
Gold was discovered in Georgetown by George and David Griffiths in 1859, and Georgetown eventually took its name from the former. The gold finds in the area were relatively minor, but a major lode of silver was discovered in 1864, kicking off the local boom. Georgetown became a center for thousands of miners operating in the surrounding hills. Silver Plume was developed as one of a series of satellite camps, and in 1884 the Georgetown Loop Railroad was built, connecting the two by rail. Mining declined in the 1890s, and the area has since had a relatively low population.

See also

National Register of Historic Places listings in Clear Creek County, Colorado

References

External links

Georgetown–Silver Plume National Historic District
Georgetown Loop Historic Mining & Railroad Park
Georgetown Loop Railroad
Town of Georgetown
Historic Georgetown, Inc.

Geography of Clear Creek County, Colorado
National Historic Landmarks in Colorado
National Historic Landmark Districts
Historic districts on the National Register of Historic Places in Colorado
Tourist attractions in Clear Creek County, Colorado
Railroad-related National Historic Landmarks
National Register of Historic Places in Clear Creek County, Colorado